CBV Binnenland is a Dutch basketball club based in Barendrecht. Its women's team plays in the national first tier Vrouwen Basketball League (VBL). The men's team plays in the national second tier Promotiedivisie.

Honours

Women's team
Vrouwen Basketball League
Champions (1): 2013–14
NBB Cup
Champions (3): 2004, 2014, 2015
Supercup
Champions (2): 2015, 2018
WBL Final Four
Champions (6): 2001, 2002, 2005, 2011, 2013, 2014

Men's team
Promotiedivisie
Champions (1): 2010–11

Notable players
 Natalie van den Adel (5 seasons: '06-'08, '10-'12, '13)

References

External links
Official website
Basketball teams in the Netherlands
Basketball teams established in 1968
1968 establishments in the Netherlands